The 1997 season is the 75th season of competitive football in Ecuador.

National leagues

Serie A
Champion: Barcelona (13th title)
International cup qualifiers:
1998 Copa Libertadores: Barcelona, Deportivo Quito
1998 Copa CONMEBOL: LDU Quito
Relegated: Calvi, Deportivo Quevedo

Serie B
Winner: Panamá (1st title)
Promoted: Panamá, Delfín
Relegated: 9 de Octubre, Esmeraldas Petrolero

Segunda
Winner: Deportivo Quinindé
Promoted: Deportivo Quinindé, Audaz Octubrino

Clubs in international competitions

National teams

Senior team
The Ecuador national team played nineteen matches in 1997: ten 1998 FIFA World Cup qualifiers, 4 at the 1997 Copa América, and five friendlies.

1998 FIFA World Cup qualifiers

Qualification to the 1998 FIFA World Cup in France finished in 1997. Ecuador finished 6th in CONMEBOL and failed to qualify to the tournament.

Copa América

The 1997 Copa América was held in Bolivia.

Group stage
Ecuador was drawn into Group A with Argentina, Chile, and Paraguay. They finished first in the group and advanced to the quarterfinals.

Quarterfinals

Friendlies

External links
 National leagues details on RSSSF

 
1997